Stan Vandersluys (11 July 1924 – 27 February 2005) was  a former Australian rules footballer who played with Fitzroy and Richmond in the Victorian Football League (VFL).

Notes

External links 		
		
		
		
		
		
		
		
1924 births		
2005 deaths		
Australian rules footballers from Victoria (Australia)		
Fitzroy Football Club players		
Richmond Football Club players